This is a list of current and former television series broadcast by ABC Spark, a specialty channel based on the U.S. cable channel Freeform.

Current programming

Original shows from Freeform
Baby Daddy
The Bold Type
Melissa & Joey
Switched at Birth
Grown-ish
10 Things I Hate About You 
The Watchful Eye 
Love Trip: Paris

Syndicated
Degrassi: The Next Generation
Last Man Standing
Nancy Drew
Man with a Plan
Everybody Hates Chris
Reign
Beauty and the Beast

Upcoming programming

Original

Former programming

Acquired from Freeform

Becoming Us
Beverly Hills Nannies
Beyond
Bunheads
Chasing Life
Cheer Squad
Cloak & Dagger
Dancing Fools
Dead of Summer
Everything's Gonna Be Okay
Fallen
Family Game Night
Good Trouble
Greek
The Fosters
Freak Out
Huge
Jane by Design
Job or No Job
Kevin from Work
Lincoln Heights
The Lying Game
The Middleman
Make It or Break It
Monica the Medium
Motherland: Fort Salem
Mystery Girls
Next Step Realty: NYC
The Nine Lives of Chloe King
Party of Five
Recovery Road
Roommates
Siren
Startup U
State of Georgia
Stitchers
Truth & Iliza
The Secret Life of the American Teenager
Twisted
The Vineyard
Young & Hungry

Other acquired programming

8 Simple Rules
America's Funniest Home Videos (Season 6-8)
America's Funniest Home Videos (seasons 11-25)
Boy Meets World
Blossom
Cache Craze
Cash Mob
Celebrity Damage Control
Celebrity Legacies
Charmed
Come Date With Me
Criminal Minds: Suspect Behavior
Da Vinci's Inquest
Deal with It
ER Vets
Extreme Babysitting
Extreme Makeover: Home Edition
Extra
Family Matters
Full House
The Funny Pit
Ghost Whisperer
Happy Endings
Home Improvement
How To Be Indie
Jamie Oliver's Food Revolution
Just for Laughs: Gags
Kaya
Less Than Perfect
Life with Boys
Lizzie McGuire
Love Trap
Lady Jewelpet
Malibu Country
The Middle
Mr. Young
My House Your Money
My Wife and Kids
Mysterious Ways
Mystery Hunters
Open Heart
Pet Heroes
Pick a Puppy
Princess
Private Eyes
Ransom
Rookie Blue
Ride
Rules of Engagement
Say Yes to the Dress Canada
Scrubs
Shannon and Sophie
Smallville
Splatalot
Student Bodies
Supernatural
That's So Raven
That's So Weird!
Trophy Wife
Ugly Betty
Undercover High
The Vampire Diaries
Wheels That Fail
Wipeout
Wipeout Canada
Working the Engels

References

External links
ABCSpark.ca

ABC Spark